Nellore City Assembly constituency is a constituency of the Andhra Pradesh Legislative Assembly in India. It is one among 8 constituencies in the Nellore district of Andhra Pradesh.

Anil Kumar Poluboina  is the present MLA of the constituency, who won the 2019 Andhra Pradesh Legislative Assembly election from Yuvajana Sramika Rythu Congress Party.

Overview 
It is part of the Nellore Lok Sabha constituency along with another six Vidhan Sabha segments, namely, Kandukur presently in Nellore district, Kavali, Atmakur, Kovuru, Nellore Rural and Udayagiri in Nellore district.

Members of Legislative Assembly

Election results

Assembly Elections 2019

Assembly elections 2014

Assembly Elections 2009

Assembly Elections 2004

Assembly elections 1999

Assembly elections 1994

Assembly elections 1989

Assembly elections 1985

Assembly elections 1983

Assembly elections 1978

Assembly elections 1972

Assembly elections 1967

Assembly elections 1962

Assembly elections 1955

Assembly elections 1952

References 

Assembly constituencies of Andhra Pradesh